In association football, a goalkeeper is said to "keep a clean sheet" if they prevent their opponents scoring any goals during an entire match. Since the Premier League's formation at the start of the 1992–93 season, 16 goalkeepers have managed to keep 100 or more clean sheets in the Premier League.

Peter Schmeichel was the first goalkeeper to keep 100 clean sheets and Petr Čech is the only player to keep 200. Čech also took the fewest games to reach 100 clean sheets, holds the record for most clean sheets kept in a single season, with 24. The record for consecutive clean sheets is held by Edwin van der Sar, who went 14 games without conceding in 2008–09 for Manchester United.

The first goalkeepers to keep a clean sheet in the Premier League were Tim Flowers and Ian Walker on the opening day of the inaugural season, in a 0–0 draw between Southampton and Tottenham Hotspur; all other goalkeepers conceded that day. Each year, the goalkeeper who keeps the most clean sheets during the Premier League season is awarded the Premier League Golden Glove award. First presented in 2004–05, nine goalkeepers have won the award, with Joe Hart and Petr Čech sharing the record for most wins, with four.

Players
 Bold shows players still playing in the Premier League.
 The list of teams for individual players include all teams that they have played for in the Premier League.

Notes

References

Goal
Premier League records and statistics
Association football player non-biographical articles